Lucas Evangelista Santana de Oliveira (born 6 May 1995) is a Brazilian professional footballer who plays as a central midfielder for Red Bull Bragantino, on loan from Nantes.

Career

Desportivo Brasil
Evangelista started his career at Desportivo Brasil's youth team in 2009, the midfielder went on trial at Manchester United in 2012 before moving to São Paulo that same year.

São Paulo
Evangelista was promoted to Tricolor paulista in May 2013, after the club had been eliminated in 2013 Copa Libertadores. The club's president, Juvenal Juvêncio, along the coach of that time, Ney Franco, excluded seven players from the squad, promoting players from the youth team to the senior squad to replace them. The midfielder made his debut in a 0–0 against Atlético Mineiro in June 2013.

On 11 August 2013, he scored his first goal playing for São Paulo FC in a 1–2 defeat against Portuguesa de Desportos. Evangelista lobbed the player marking him and shot to beat Portuguesa's goalkeeper Lauro. Despite the team's crisis at the time, the youngster praised his first goal for the club, dedicating it to his father (it was Father's Day in Brazil that day), Jesus.

After the 2013 season, Evangelista praised his chances at the club's senior team. He was quoted in Brazilian press as saying "At the beginning, when I was promoted, I was shocked. We are treated differently at youth level, but I have been gradually adapting to the team's style. We unfortunately didn't have a good year, but it was productive at a personal level."

Udinese Calcio
On 28 August 2014, Evangelista joined Italian Serie A side, Udinese for €4 million. In his first 1.5 years at Udine, he made just four appearances.

On 20 January 2016, Evangelista moved to Panathinaikos for the rest of the season.

Nantes
On 27 July 2018, Evangelista joined Ligue 1 side Nantes on a five-year deal.

Honours
Brazil U20
 Toulon Tournament: 2014

References

External links

1995 births
Living people
Association football midfielders
Brazilian footballers
Brazil under-20 international footballers
Brazil youth international footballers
Brazilian expatriate footballers
Campeonato Brasileiro Série A players
Serie A players
Super League Greece players
Primeira Liga players
Ligue 1 players
São Paulo FC players
Udinese Calcio players
Panathinaikos F.C. players
G.D. Estoril Praia players
FC Nantes players
Vitória S.C. players
Red Bull Bragantino players
Expatriate footballers in Italy
Expatriate footballers in Greece
Expatriate footballers in Portugal
Expatriate footballers in France
2015 South American Youth Football Championship players